Jack William O'Connor (born June 2, 1958) is a former Major League Baseball pitcher.

Sources

1958 births
Living people
American expatriate baseball players in Canada
Baltimore Orioles players
Baseball players from California
Calgary Cannons players
Indianapolis Indians players
Jamestown Expos players
Lethbridge Expos players
Major League Baseball pitchers
Memphis Chicks players
Minnesota Twins players
Montreal Expos players
People from Twentynine Palms, California
Rochester Red Wings players
Syracuse Chiefs players
Toledo Mud Hens players
West Palm Beach Expos players